The 2006–07 World Bowls Tour is a multi competition tournament over a season in bowls. The season started on 29 October 2006 and lasted until 9 February 2007. The World Bowls Tour is organised by the Professional Bowls Association, the World Bowls Ltd and the World Indoor Bowls Council.
It is made up of four ranking event tournaments, The tournaments are:
The engage International Open 2006, at Ponds Forge, Sheffield
The Great British Mobility Group Scottish International Open 2006, at Dewars Centre, Perth
Potters Holidays World Indoor Bowls Championships 2007, at Potters Holiday Resort, Hopton, Norfolk
Welsh International Open 2007 at Selwyn Samuel Centre, Llanelli

Players 
The top 16 players automatically entered into the four main tournaments. The rest of the players are made up of qualifiers.
The top 16 for the 2006–07 season were:
	 Greg Harlow
	 Jason Greenslade
	 David Gourlay
	 Andy Thomson
	 Paul Foster
	 Alex Marshall
	 Ian Bond
	 Robert Weale
	 Kelvin Kerkow
        Mark Royal
	 John Price
	 Jonathan Ross
	 Mark McMahon
	 Bill Jackson
	 Mervyn King
	 Les Gillett

Calendar

See also
2007-08 World Bowls Tour
 2007 in bowls

External links
Official website

2006 in bowls
2007 in bowls